Aphyocypris pulchrilineata is a species of cyprinid in the genus Aphyocypris, endemic to China.

References

Cyprinidae
Freshwater fish of China
Cyprinid fish of Asia